These are the Canadian number-one albums of 1992. The chart was compiled and published by RPM every Saturday.

References

See also
List of Canadian number-one singles of 1992

1992
1992 record charts
1992 in Canadian music